Sachima is a sweet snack in Chinese cuisine made of fluffy strands of fried batter bound together with a stiff sugar syrup, and of an appearance somewhat similar to American Rice Krispies Treats. It originated in Manchuria and is now popular throughout China. Its decoration and flavor vary in different regional Chinese cuisines, but the appearance of all versions is essentially the same.

Regional variations

Manchu
In Manchu cuisine originally, sachima is a sweet snack. It mainly consists of flour, butter, and rock sugar. It is now popular in mainland China among children and adults.

Cantonese
The Cantonese pastry version of sachima is slightly sweet. It is also made of essentially the same ingredients as the other varieties of sachima. It is often sprinkled with sesame seeds, raisins or dried coconut. The  Cantonese variety of sachima ranges from chewy to crunchy in texture. Most overseas Chinatowns offer the Cantonese style of the pastry. It is commonly found in Hong Kong.

Fujian
Many of the Fujian distribution companies manufacture packaged versions of Sachima.  This version has sesame and is made of wheat flour, vegetable oil, egg, milk, granular sugar, and malt sugar.  The taste is comparatively plain compared to the more sweetened Cantonese version.

Mauritius 
In Mauritius, sachima is called "gâteau macaroni" (lit. translated as "macaroni cake"). It is a traditional Chinese cake sold and eaten by Sino-Mauritians.

Myanmar (Burma)
A similar dish called mayway mont (မရွေးမုန့်), consisting of puffed grains of early ripened glutinous rice congealed into a mass with jaggery syrup, is a popular traditional Burmese snack or mont.

Vietnam
A similar dish called bánh bỏng gạo or
khẩu sli consisting of puffed grains of early ripened glutinous rice congealed into a mass with sugar and ginger, sometimes used peanut. This is a traditional dessert of Tay people, Giay people. It is also popular in the Northern regions as Lai Chau, Cao Bang, Bac Giang.

See also
 Çäkçäk
 Funnel cake
 Yeot-gangjeong
 List of Chinese desserts
 Rengginang

References

Chinese desserts
Chinese pastries
Manchu cuisine
Burmese cuisine
Mauritian cuisine
Burmese desserts and snacks